This is a list of Members of the Senedd elected to the sixth Senedd at the 2021 election. There are a total of 60 members elected, 40 were elected from first past the post constituencies with a further 20 members being returned from five regions, each electing four members through mixed member proportional representation. In between elections, members of the legislature may not necessarily be of the same party or the same candidate elected in 2021.

Composition of the Senedd

Senedd members by party following 2021 election

Senedd members by constituency and region following 2021 election

See also 

Second Drakeford government
1999 National Assembly for Wales election and Members of the 1st National Assembly for Wales
2003 National Assembly for Wales election and Members of the 2nd National Assembly for Wales
2007 National Assembly for Wales election and Members of the 3rd National Assembly for Wales
2011 National Assembly for Wales election and Members of the 4th National Assembly for Wales
2016 National Assembly for Wales election and Members of the 5th National Assembly for Wales
2021 Senedd election
List of by-elections to the Senedd and List of elections to the Senedd
Senedd constituencies and electoral regions

References 

Lists of members of the Senedd